Holystone Slope is a glacial slope distributary from Flight Deck Névé,  wide, that descends northwest over subdued steps between Dotson Ridge and Dory Nunatak in the Convoy Range of Victoria Land. Named by the New Zealand Geographic Board in 1993 in association with other nautical theme place names in the Convoy Range.

References

Glaciers of Victoria Land